Johan Christian Viggo Ullmann (21 December 1848 – 30 August 1910) was a Norwegian educator and politician with Venstre, the Norwegian social-liberal party. He was the son of the author Vilhelmine Ullmann, brother of the feminist Ragna Nielsen and the great grandfather of actress Liv Ullmann. Norway's first social doctor was his grandchild, also named Viggo Ullmann (Lillehammer, 1920–).

Career as a teacher 

From 1870 he studied philology at the University of Christiania and was cand.philol. 1872. He received his Bachelor of Arts in 1875, after which he worked as a teacher at the Folk High Schools Skulestad, Østre Moland, Landvik, Bratsberg, Drangedal, Gjerpen and Vinje. At the liberal Folk High School in Seljord (Seljord Folkehøgskule), he worked for a more vocational approach to the study. In this period, he was also chairman of the publisher Det Norske Samlaget, as well as editor for the newspaper Varden. His pedagogy was influenced by the ideas of  N. F. S. Grundtvig, where theology and learning was seen as a voluntary act, and obligatory exams were replaced by voluntary self-evaluation. He was also a spokesman of the theorems  of American economist Henry George.

Political career 
He was the leader of the party Venstre (1893–1894 and 1898–1900), Member of Parliament for Bratsberg 1898–1900, Venstre's parliamentary leader 1893–1894 and President of the Storting 1892–94, 1897 and 1898–1900. In 1884 he was a co-founder of the Norwegian Association for Women's Rights. He helped The Association for Women's Suffrage (led by his sister, Ragna Nielsen) to write a suggestion for a change of the constitution, something which brought him into conflict with certain religious societies.  Together with Prime Minister Wollert Konow, he was central in Norwegian Peace Association (Norwegian: Norges Fredslag) and was later (in 1890) behind the establishment of The Parliament's Peace Association (Norwegian:Stortingets Fredsforening) and The Peace Letter to King Oscar II of Sweden.  Ullman was First Deputy Member of the Nobel Committee (7 August 1897 – 5 June 1900). From 1902 until he died, he was county governor of Bratsberg amt (now Telemark).

Selected works 
Ullman also published several books:
 Plutarks levnetsbeskrivelser (Plutarch's Lives), 2 volumes, 1876–1877, translation
 Ammianus Marcellinus’s 25 aar av Roms historie (Ammianus Marcellinus’ 25 years of Roman history), 3 volumes, 1877–1881, translation
 Haandbok i verdenshistorien (Handbook to world history), 4 volumes, 1899–1905.

References

Other sources

External links 
Viggo Ullmanns dødsfall i kirkebok for Vestre Aker
Politiske taler av Viggo Ullmann, virksommeord.uib.no

1848 births
1910 deaths
Liberal Party (Norway) politicians
Presidents of the Storting
Members of the Storting
Norwegian Association for Women's Rights people
Georgist politicians
County governors of Norway